Google Wallet (or simply Wallet) is a digital wallet platform developed by Google. It is available for the Android, Wear OS, and Fitbit OS operating systems, and was announced on May 11, 2022, at the 2022 Google I/O keynote. It began rolling out on Android smartphones on July 18, co-existing with the 2020 Google Pay app and replacing the 2018 one.

History 
The "Google Wallet" brand name was first used for the company's mobile payment system of the same name, which was introduced in 2011 before being merged with Android Pay into a new app called Google Pay in 2018. The old Wallet app, with its functionality reduced to a peer-to-peer payments service, was rebranded Google Pay Send before it was discontinued as well in 2020. In 2020, the Google Pay app underwent an extensive redesign based on Google's India-focused Tez app, expanding into an all-encompassing personal finance app. This replaced the Tez app on the Play Store, while the 2018 Google Pay app continued to co-exist as a separate, pre-installed app on Android smartphones.

Google Wallet (2011) launches 
Google demonstrated the original version of the original Google Wallet app at a press conference on May 26, 2011. The first app was released in the US only on September 19, 2011. Initially, the app only supported Mastercard cards issued by Citibank.

On May 15, 2013, Google announced the integration of Google Wallet and Gmail, allowing users to send money through Gmail attachments. While Google Wallet is available only in the United States, the Gmail integration is currently available in the U.S. and the United Kingdom.

In 2015, a physical Google Wallet card was launched as an optional addition to the app, which allowed users to make purchases at point-of-sale (in stores or online) drawing from funds in their Google Wallet account, attached debit card account, or bank account. The card could also be used to withdraw cash at ATMs with no Google-associated fee, and could be used like a debit card for virtually any purpose, including such things as renting a car. The Wallet Card was discontinued on June 30, 2016, and replaced with Android Pay.

The original version of Google Wallet allowed users to make point-of-sale purchases with their mobile devices using near-field communication (NFC) technology. As of September 2015, however, Google dropped NFC from Google Wallet, offering the technology only through Android Pay, which is a separate application available only to Android users. As a result, any gift cards, loyalty programs, and promotional offers stored in an older version of Google Wallet could no longer be used.

Android Pay launches 
Originally launched as Android Pay, the service was released at Google I/O 2015. Android Pay was a successor to and built on the base established by Google Wallet which was released in 2011. It also used technology from the carrier-backed Softcard—Google had acquired its intellectual property in February 2015. At launch, the service was compatible with 70% of Android devices and was accepted at over 700,000 merchants. The old Google Wallet still powered web-based Play Store purchases and some app-based peer-to-peer payments.

In 2016, Google began a public trial in Silicon Valley of a related mobile app called Hands Free. In this system, the customer does not need to present a phone or card. Instead, a customer announces that they wish to "pay with Google" and give their initials to the cashier, who verifies their identity with a photo previously uploaded to the system. The customer's phone will only authorize payment if its geographic location system indicates that it is near a participating store.

On September 18, 2017, Google launched a payments app in India known as Tez, utilizing the Unified Payments Interface (UPI). On August 28, 2018, Google rebranded Tez to Google Pay.

Android Pay and Google Wallet become Google Pay 

On January 8, 2018, Google announced that Google Wallet would be merged into Android Pay, with the service as a whole rebranded as Google Pay. This merger extends the platform into web-based payments integrated into other Google and third-party services. It also took over the branding of Google Chrome's autofill feature. Google Pay adopts the features of both Android Pay and Google Wallet through its in-store, peer-to-peer, and online payments services.

The rebranding began to roll out as an update to the Android Pay app on February 20, 2018; the app was given an updated design and now displays a personalized list of nearby stores that support Google Pay. The rebranded service provided a new API that allows merchants to add the payment service to websites, apps, Stripe, Braintree, and Google Assistant. The service allows users to use the payment cards they have on file in their Google Account.

Google Pay becomes Google Wallet (2022) 
In January 2022, Bloomberg News reported that the company was planning to transform Google Pay into a "comprehensive digital wallet", following the app's reported slow growth and the shutdown of Plex. In April, it was reported that Google was planning to revive the "Google Wallet" branding in a new app or interface, and integrated with Google Pay. Google officially announced Google Wallet on May 11, 2022, at the 2022 Google I/O keynote. The app began rolling out on Android smartphones on July 18, replacing the 2018 app and co-existing with the 2020 Google Pay app in the U.S. While the app name itself was changed from Google Pay to Google Wallet, the service name of actually paying for things online or in-store remains as "Google Pay."

International deployment 
Upon its UK launch, Android Pay supported Mastercard, Visa, and debit cards from many of the UK's major financial institutions including Bank of Scotland, First Direct, Halifax, HSBC, Lloyds Bank, M&S Bank, MBNA and Nationwide Building Society "with new banks being added all the time", according to Google. Natwest, RBS and Ulster Bank launched on September 14, 2016. On September 8, 2016 it was reported that UK banks TSB and Santander would be participating in the following weeks. Android Pay was launched in Singapore on June 28, 2016 and in Australia on July 14, 2016.

Android Pay launched in the Republic of Ireland on December 7, 2016 and was initially available to customers of AIB and KBC, having since been extended to Bank of Ireland and Ulster Bank. The service works with both credit and debit cards.

On December 21, 2018, Google Payment obtained an e-money license in Lithuania the license will enable Google to process payments, issue e-money, and handle electronic money wallets in the EU.

On November 17, 2020, Google Pay was enabled by Mastercard in ten new European countries: Austria, Bulgaria, Estonia, Greece, Hungary, Latvia, Lithuania, Netherlands, Portugal, and Romania. Cardholders of participating Mastercard partner banks for these countries will be able to use the Google Pay service through their respective mobile banking apps.

On June 30, 2022, it was announced at the Google for Mexico event that Google Pay & the Google Wallet app would soon be available in Mexico.

Features 
Google Wallet allows users to store items such as payment cards for use via Google Pay, as well as passes such as loyalty cards, digital keys, digital identification cards, transit passes, event tickets, and health passes.

Digital car keys in Google Wallet can still be utilized when the screen is off or the battery is depleted. However, unlike most other secure element-based digital wallets, such as Samsung Wallet, Huawei Wallet, and Apple Wallet, this functionality does not extend to transit cards.

Although the Wear OS and Android versions of Wallet are currently very fragmented, Google has stated that its "long-term goal is for feature parity on your watch and phone."

Comparison between phone and wearable versions

Ecosystem 

Google Wallet has a passes feature, which exists in a larger ecosystem. They are presented in the bottom half of the app and can be sorted manually. Developers must first be granted access to the Google Wallet API before they can author such items.

In its simplest form, an interaction (or transaction) between a pass and a system is facilitated by a 1D or 2D code, although it requires the customer to initiate the activity. Passes can also contain nothing but plain text or an image.

In addition to retailer-specific passes, Google Wallet also supports contactless student IDs that can be added through the Transact eAccounts and CBORD GET Mobile applications. Government-issued IDs are also supported via an open beta in one US state: Maryland.

Smart Tap 
Google Wallet offers Smart Tap technology for use by developers and merchants that enable NFC passes to be stored within a customer's Google Wallet for use at a compatible terminal. Google offers the technology free of charge through the Google Pay & Wallet Console. Each pass issuer is given a Collector ID to use to configure their compatible terminals. If multiple passes within a user's Wallet match a terminal's Collector ID, a carousel will appear when tapping, allowing the user to tap their device, swipe to the next pass, and then repeat the process until all desired passes are transmitted.

This technology is currently used by a variety of businesses worldwide for a wide range of uses. Walt Disney World Resort (USA), Ticketmaster (USA & UK), and Pathé Cinémas (France) use it for ticketing. Redbox (USA), Nando's (UK & Ireland), and Woolworth's (Australia) use it for loyalty programs. And Anytime Fitness (USA) and David Lloyd Clubs (UK) use it for memberships.

Availability

Supported countries 

, Google Wallet is available in 60 countries worldwide for both Android & Wear OS:

 *
 
 
 *
 
 *
 
 
 
 
 
 
 
 
 
 
 
 
 *
 
 
 
 
 
 
 *
 
 *
 
 *
 
 
 
 
 
 
 
 *
 
 
 
 
 
 
 
 *
 
 
 
 
 
 
 
 *
 
 *
 
  (includes )
  (includes )
 *
* = Not available for Google Wallet for Fitbit devices

Upcoming 
Support for Japan was promised along with the initial announcement for Google Wallet.

Supported loyalty programs 
These programs are conveyed through NFC through Google Wallet's Smart Tap feature. Some of these can be added through the Google Wallet app directly, while others must be added through the respective retailer's app or website. Programs that support One Tap are conveyed at the same time as a payment card stored in Google Wallet. Conversely, Two Tap programs are redeemed in a sequential manner, where a loyalty pass is scanned first, and then payment can be presented.

Usage within public transport systems 
Due to the open nature of the Android platform, some transit cards are only available through other Android-based mobile wallets or via their own apps (e.g. Octopus card for Samsung Wallet or TAP for Android). Transit cards that support direct provisioning can be issued within the Google Wallet app itself, without needing to download a separate third party application.

Supported car keys 
These car models can be unlocked and started via NFC with the Pixel 6 and Pixel 7. Future car models that support operation via UWB will require an UWB compatible device, such as the Pixel 6 Pro or Pixel 7 Pro.

Supported government-issued identifications 
These territories permit their residents to save their government-issued identification credentials in Google Wallet. Mobile IDs in Google Wallet operate over the ISO 18013 mobile personal identification standard. Users have a choice whether to present their ID via NFC or QR. Once the credential is read, the ID holder must confirm the personal information they wish to share (full name, age, etc.) The transmission to the reader device will be completed over BLE after the presentation is fully verified. Available for devices running Android 8 or later.

Note: this feature is currently in beta.

Supported campus identifications

See also 
 Apple Wallet
 Google Checkout
 Samsung Wallet
 List of campus identifications in mobile wallets

References

External links 
 

Android (operating system) software
Computer-related introductions in 2018
Computer-related introductions in 2022
Wallet
Mobile payments
Online payments